is a Japanese professor of Urdu at Daito Bunka University, where he also serves as dean of the Faculty of International Relations and director of the Institute of Contemporary Asian Studies.

Early life and career
Kataoka was born in Saitama Prefecture. He entered the Tokyo University of Foreign Studies' Urdu department in 1964. He describes himself as being an initially unmotivated student, even once failing a class in his second semester. However, he was inspired to work harder after his professor, Takeshi Suzuki, assigned Krishan Chander's short story Sufaid Phool as class reading. The story describes a young mute boy who had fallen in love with a girl but had no way to express his feelings to her except through glances and gestures, which echoed a situation Kataoka was facing in his personal life with a girl he liked but to whom he was too afraid to speak. In the early 1970s, he attended a two-year course in Urdu at the University of Karachi. He joined the faculty of Osaka University in 1974, and moved to Daito Bunka University in 1986.

Awards and honours
In 2009, the Pakistani government announced that it would confer the civil decoration Sitara-i-Imtiaz upon Kataoka for his contributions in the field of education.

Works
Kataoka has published over 60 research papers on Urdu literature and language as well as the culture of Pakistan, in addition to his work in translating South Asian poetry and literature into Japanese. Among the works he has translated are:
. Translation of poetry by Faiz Ahmed Faiz.
. Translation of short stories by Saadat Hasan Manto.
. Translation of short stories by Saadat Hasan Manto.
. Further translation of poetry by Faiz Ahmed Faiz.
. Translation of the Diwan-i-Ghalib by 19th-century poet Mirza Ghalib.

References

1941 births
Japanese expatriates in Pakistan
Academic staff of Daito Bunka University
Living people
Recipients of Sitara-i-Imtiaz
Urdu–Japanese translators
University of Karachi alumni
Academic staff of Osaka University